Wang Yu (born 19 November 1982 in Tianjin) is a Chinese chess player who holds the FIDE titles of International Master (IM) and Woman Grandmaster (WGM).

Chess career
In 1996, Wang won the World Under-14 Girls Championship and in 1998, won the World U16 Girls Championship. In 1999, she won the Asian Junior Girls' Championship in Vũng Tàu. Wang finished runner-up at the World Under-18 Girls Championship of 2000.

Wang Yu won the Asian Women's Chess Championship of 2004 in Beirut. In 2005, she won the Chinese Women's Chess Championship.

National team
Wang played for the B team in 1999 and for the first team in 2003 at the Women's Asian Team Chess Championship (overall record is 11 games: +6, =2, -3). She also played for the Chinese women's team at the World Team Chess Championship in Beersheba (overall record was 6 games:+0, =2, -4). In 2006 Wang Yu was a member of the Chinese team which won the bronze medal at the Women's 37th Chess Olympiad (played 4 games in total: +1, =1, -2).

Wang was part of the women's team in the 2007 China-Russia Summit Match.

IM title
In 2007, she gained the International Master (IM) title. She achieved her IM norms at:
 Tan Chin Nam Cup International GM Open in Qingdao, China (July 4–8, 2002); score 4.0/9
 Aeroflot Open 2004 B Group in Moscow, Russia (February 16–26, 2004); score 5.5/9
 Dubai Open 2005 in Dubai, UAE (April 4–12, 2005); score 5.0/9

WGM title
In 2003, she gained the Woman Grandmaster (WGM) title. She achieved her WGM norms at:

 China Women's Ch.  in Suzhou, China (March–April 2001); score 6.0/9
 9th Asian Women's Ch.  in Chennai, India (Sept 2001); score 7.0/9
 Tan Chin Nam Cup GM in Qingdao (July 2002); score 4.0/9

China Chess League
Wang Yu plays for Beijing chess club in the China Chess League (CCL).

See also
Chess in China

References

External links

Wang Yu A. at NICBase (archived)
"Wang Yu keeps China's reputation intact". SPORTSTAR, VOL.26 :: NO.25 :: June 21–27, 2003. (archived)

1982 births
Living people
Chess International Masters
Chess woman grandmasters
Chinese female chess players
World Youth Chess Champions
Asian Games medalists in chess
Chess players at the 2010 Asian Games
Chess players from Tianjin
Asian Games gold medalists for China
Medalists at the 2010 Asian Games